Schistocerca albolineata, the white-lined bird grasshopper, is a species of bird grasshopper in the family Acrididae. It is found in North America, often near the U.S.-Mexico border.

References

Further reading

External links

 

Acrididae
Insects described in 1875